The 2007 CERH Women's European League was the inaugural edition of CERH's competition for women's rink hockey teams. It took place in Sant Hipòlit de Voltregà between May 24 – 27, 2007 and it was contested by fourteen teams from six countries. Gijón HC defeated CE Arenys de Munt in the final to win the competition.

Group stage

Group A

Group B

Group C

Group D

Placement Rounds

Round 1

Round 2

Final Four

References

CERH
2007 in Spanish women's sport
Rink Hockey European Female League
International roller hockey competitions hosted by Spain